William Francis Taylor may refer to:
Francis Taylor, 1st Baron Maenan (1854-1951), full name William Francis Kyffin Taylor 
William Taylor (Archdeacon of Liverpool) (1820-1906), full name William Francis Taylor